Robert Hartley  (1915-1998) was a British stage, film and television actor.

Selected filmography
Film
 At the Stroke of Nine (1957)
 Bread (1971)

Television
 Z-Cars (1962–1974)
 The Avengers (1963)
 David Copperfield (1966)
 The Rivals of Sherlock Holmes (1971–73)
 New Scotland Yard (1972)
 The Onedin Line (1972)
 Lillie (1979)
 Prince Regent (1979)
 A Kind of Loving (1982)
 Grange Hill (1979–1983)
 The Charmer (1987)
 Upstairs, Downstairs (played a coroner in an episode called Joke Over)

References

External links

1915 births
Male actors from Liverpool
British male film actors
British male stage actors
British male television actors
1998 deaths
20th-century British male actors